Hugo Hoyama (born May 9, 1969) is a retired Brazilian table tennis player of Japanese origin who has won several medals in single, double and team events in the Latin American Table Tennis Championships.
Along with Gustavo Tsuboi and Thiago Monteiro, Hoyama was part of the winning team at the 2007 Pan American Games and 2011 Pan American Games.

Career

Born in São Bernardo do Campo, São Paulo, Hoyama broke the Brazilian record of most gold medals in the Pan American Games, which used to belong to the Brazilian swimmer Gustavo Borges and participated in every Olympic game since debuting as an Olympian at the 1992 Olympic Games and competed in the 2012 Olympic Games, where he plans to retire as an Olympian.

In 2007, Hoyama was invited by Carlos Nuzman from the Brazilian Olympic Committee to be the flag bearer for Brazil at the 2011 Pan American Games in Guadalajara. According to Nuzman, the choice of Hoyama displays support from the committee to all sports that Brazilians play.

Hugo is the founder of the Hugo Hoyama Foundation. Other than his native Portuguese, Hoyama also speaks English, Spanish and Japanese

In popular culture
Hoyama is briefly mentioned in the eighth episode of the fourth season of The Office American TV series. Table tennis plays a major role in the plot and Dwight Schrute says he even has a life-size poster of Hugo Hoyama in his room.

See also
 List of table tennis players

References

External links

 
  Hugo Hoyama's official website (Portuguese)
 Table Tennis Master 

1969 births
Living people
Brazilian male table tennis players
Brazilian people of Japanese descent
Olympic table tennis players of Brazil
Table tennis players at the 1992 Summer Olympics
Table tennis players at the 1996 Summer Olympics
Table tennis players at the 2000 Summer Olympics
Table tennis players at the 2004 Summer Olympics
Table tennis players at the 2008 Summer Olympics
Table tennis players at the 2012 Summer Olympics
Table tennis players at the 2007 Pan American Games
Table tennis players at the 2011 Pan American Games
People from São Bernardo do Campo
Pan American Games gold medalists for Brazil
Pan American Games silver medalists for Brazil
Pan American Games bronze medalists for Brazil
Pan American Games medalists in table tennis
South American Games gold medalists for Brazil
South American Games bronze medalists for Brazil
South American Games medalists in table tennis
Competitors at the 2006 South American Games
Medalists at the 2007 Pan American Games
Medalists at the 2011 Pan American Games
Sportspeople from São Paulo (state)
20th-century Brazilian people